Yegor Sergeyevich Petukhov (born 28 February 1994) is a Russian-born Kazakhstani ice hockey player for Barys Astana in the Kontinental Hockey League (KHL) and the Kazakhstani national team.

He represented Kazakhstan at the 2021 IIHF World Championship.

References

External links

1994 births
Living people
Barys Nur-Sultan players
Kazakhstani ice hockey forwards
Sportspeople from Barnaul